Euchromia magna is a moth of the subfamily Arctiinae. It was described by Charles Swinhoe in 1891. It is found in India and Sri Lanka.

Hindwings with vein 3 and 4 stalked. Body blue black. Antennae with white distal part. Abdomen with two yellow bands. Forewing with a small sub-basal, two large medial, one sub-apical and two sub-marginal hyaline spots. Hindwings with a large basal hyaline patch crossed by the sub-costal and median veins and a sub-marginal spot crossed by veins 4 and 6.

References

Moths described in 1891
Euchromiina